German submarine U-72 was a Type VIIC submarine of Nazi Germany's Kriegsmarine during World War II.

U-72 was launched on 22 November 1940 and commissioned on 4 January 1941. U-72 served with 24th U-boat Flotilla (a training unit), and later with 21st U-boat Flotilla (also a training unit), from 2 July 1941 to 30 March 1945. U-72 was used throughout World War II as a training boat until it was sunk in a daylight American bombing raid on 30 March 1945.

Design
German Type VIIC submarines were preceded by the shorter Type VIIB submarines. U-72 had a displacement of  when at the surface and  while submerged. She had two shafts and two  propellers.

U-72 was fitted with two  torpedo tubes at the bow, fourteen torpedoes, one  SK C/35 naval gun, 220 rounds, and one  C/30 anti-aircraft gun. The boat had a complement of between forty-four and sixty.

Wreck Site
The U 72 was found off the coast of Fla in 1971 by divers from Diver Haven, between the second and third reef.  It is now in the area of the "Graveyard of ships in North Carolina.                       

UPDATE: According to information found on the uboat.net site "Sunk on 30 March 1945 at Bremen in the shipyard of Deschimag AG Weser, in position 53.08N, 08.46E, by bombs during US air raid (8th AF).

Wreck raised until 2 July 1947 and broken up.

References

Bibliography

External links

German Type VIIC submarines
U-boats commissioned in 1941
World War II submarines of Germany
1940 ships
Ships built in Kiel
Operation Regenbogen (U-boat)
Maritime incidents in May 1945